The Allenburg Church is a Brick Gothic building near Allenburg Castle commissioned by Konrad von Jungingen, the Grand Master of the Teutonic Knights, in 1405. Seriously damaged during the First World War, the medieval building was restored and slightly expanded in 1925. After the Second World War, Allenburg was renamed Druzhba and is now part of Pravdinsky District of Kaliningrad Oblast. The church was used by local farmers as a grain-drier. It was restored by the local Lutheran community in 2005 and eventually passed to the Russian Orthodox Church in 2010.

References

Roman Catholic churches completed in 1405
Brick Gothic
Churches in Kaliningrad Oblast
Gothic architecture in Russia
15th-century churches in Russia
Cultural heritage monuments of regional significance in Kaliningrad Oblast